Ezra Wyeth (13 March 1910 – 15 October 1992) was an Australian cricketer. He played in twenty-five first-class matches for Queensland between 1933 and 1938.

Cricket career
Wyeth began his senior cricket career playing for University in Brisbane Grade Cricket in 1929 and he remained with the club for his whole career. He bowled left-hand spin and was described as unorthodox as he approached from around the wicket in his runup but bowled over the wicket and bowled with a slight limp after being hit in the foot by a drive in the early 1930s. In his career he worked at the Teachers' Training College in Brisbane.

See also
 List of Queensland first-class cricketers

References

External links
 

1910 births
1992 deaths
Australian cricketers
Queensland cricketers
Cricketers from Toowoomba
Cricketers from Queensland